Timur Odushev (born 16 January 1993) is an Azerbaijani actor, 32nd Young Artist Awards winner (2011).

For his performance in an International Feature Film, Timur Odushev won the award of Young Artist Awards 2011.

Filmography 
The Precinct 2010

References

External links
 

1993 births
Azerbaijani male film actors
Living people